Lava was an  monitor built for the Imperial Russian Navy in the mid-1860s. The design was based on the American , but was modified to suit Russian engines, guns and construction techniques. Spending her entire career with the Baltic Fleet, the ship was only active when the Gulf of Finland was not frozen, but very little is known about her service. She was struck from the Navy List in 1900, converted into a barracks ship in 1902 and then into a storage hulk for mines in 1912 and renamed Blokshiv No. 1. During World War I, she was converted into a hospital ship in 1916 and was then abandoned by the Soviets in Finland in 1918; the ship was probably later scrapped by the Finns around 1922.

Description
She displaced , and her crew numbered eight officers and 88 enlisted men in 1865. They numbered 10 officers and 100 crewmen in 1877.

The ship was fitted with a two-cylinder, horizontal direct-acting steam engine built by Carr and MacPherson of Saint Petersburg. It drove a single propeller using steam that was provided by two rectangular boilers.

Lava was designed to be armed with a pair of  smoothbore muzzle-loading guns purchased from Krupp of Germany and rifled in Russia, but the rifling project was seriously delayed and the ship was completed with nine-inch smoothbores. These lacked the penetration power necessary to deal with ironclads and they were replaced by license-built  smoothbore muzzle-loading Rodman guns in 1867–68. The Rodman guns were replaced around 1876 with the originally intended nine-inch rifled guns.

All of the wrought-iron armor that was used in the Uragan-class monitors was in  plates, just as in the Passaic-class ships. The gun turret was protected by eleven layers of armor and the pilothouse above it had eight layers of armor. Unlike their predecessors, the Uragans were built without deck armor to save weight, but Lavas deck was reinforced by the addition of  armor plates after completion.

Career
Construction of the ship began on 7 September 1863 at the Semiannikov & Poletika Shipyard in Saint Petersburg. Lava was laid down on 15 December 1863 and she was launched on 8 June 1864. She entered service on 1 September 1865 and cost a total of 1,142,700 rubles, almost double her contract cost of 600,000 rubles. The ship was assigned to the Baltic Fleet upon completion and she, and all of her sister ships except , made a port visit to Stockholm, Sweden in July–August 1865 while under the command of General Admiral Grand Duke Konstantin Nikolayevich. She was present when the American warships  and  visited Kronstadt in July–August 1866.

Later, an armored, outward-curving bulwark was fitted around the top of the turret to protect any crewmen there. Three sponsons were later added, probably during the 1870s, to the upper portion of the turret. Each sponson, one above the gun ports and one on each side of the turret, mounted a light gun, probably a  Engstrem gun, for defense against torpedo boats. A fourth gun was mounted on a platform aft of the funnel when a hurricane deck was built between the funnel and the turret, also probably during the 1870s.

Little is known about the ship's career other than that she was assigned to the newly formed Artillery Training Detachment in March 1870 and she was laid up each winter when the Gulf of Finland froze. Lava was reclassified as a coast defense ironclad on 13 February 1892 and turned over to the Port of Kronstadt for disposal on 6 July 1900, although she was not stricken until 17 August. The ship was used as a floating barracks by the Third Destroyer Division from 1902 to 1908 and was then used as an observation post during gunnery training. Lava was converted into a mine storage hulk in 1912 and renamed Blokshiv No. 1 on 14 April of that year. She was converted into a floating hospital in 1916 and may have received her old name at that time. She was abandoned by the Soviets in Helsingfors (Helsinki) when they were forced to withdraw from Finland in April 1918 according to the terms of the Treaty of Brest-Litovsk, but she was later returned by the Finns in 1922. The ship was supposedly broken up there around that time, but may have still been in existence in 1941.

Notes

Footnotes

References

Uragan-class monitors
1864 ships
Ships built in Saint Petersburg